Kirkby cum Osgodby, sometimes called Kirkby, is hamlet and former civil parish in the West Lindsey district of  Lincolnshire, England.

Kirkby cum Osgodby parish was abolished to create that of Osgodby in 1936. This successor council now styles itself Kirkby cum Osgodby.

Church

The church at Kirkby, dedicated to Saint Andrew and dating from the early 13th century and 1790, is built of limestone and ironstone. The nave was rebuilt in 1825, and the church restored in 1891, 1900 and 1923.

The base of a medieval limestone cross in the churchyard dates from the 14th century, and is both Grade II listed and an ancient scheduled monument.

References

External links

Hamlets in Lincolnshire
West Lindsey District
Former civil parishes in Lincolnshire